Soul Syndrome is the 50th studio album by American musician James Brown. The album was released in 1980, by TK Records.

Track listings
Original release
Side A

Side B

1991 UK T.K. Records reissue CD / 2xLP bonus tracks

1991 US Rhino Records reissue CD bonus tracks

References

1980 albums
James Brown albums
Albums produced by James Brown